Black Eyes is a 1939 British drama film directed by Herbert Brenon and starring Otto Kruger, Mary Maguire and Walter Rilla. It is a remake of the 1935 French film Dark Eyes.

Cast
 Otto Kruger as Ivan Ivanovich Petroff
 Mary Maguire as Tanya Petroff
 Walter Rilla as Roudine
 John Wood as Karlo Karpoff
 Marie Wright as Miss Brown
 Jenny Laird as Lucy
 O. B. Clarence as Waiter
 Ralph Truman as Diner
 Ballard Berkeley as Diner
 Ernest Butcher as Diner
 Michael Wilding as Officer

See also
 Dark Eyes (1935)

References

External links

1939 films
1939 drama films
Films shot at Associated British Studios
1930s English-language films
Films directed by Herbert Brenon
British drama films
British remakes of French films
Films set in Russia
British black-and-white films
1930s British films